Mary-Jane Rubenstein is a scholar of religion, philosophy, science studies, and gender studies. At Wesleyan University, she is Professor of Religion and Science in Society. She is also affiliated with Environmental Studies and Feminist, Gender, and Sexuality Studies.  From 2014 to 2019, she was co-chair of the Philosophy of Religion Unit of the American Academy of Religion. She is a Fellow of the International Society for Science and Religion.

Education 
Rubenstein earned a Bachelor of Arts degree in Religion and English (summa cum laude) at Williams College in 1999. With the support of a Dr. Herchel Smith Fellowship, she studied philosophical theology at the University of Cambridge, where she earned a Post-Graduate Diploma in 2000 and an MPhil in 2001. She was granted a Jacob K. Javits Fellowship to pursue doctoral work at Columbia University, where she received a PhD in Philosophy of Religion in 2006.

Career 
From 2005 to 2006, Rubenstein was Scholar-in-Residence at the Cathedral of St. John the Divine. In 2006, she earned Columbia University's Core Curriculum Award for Graduate Teaching and served as the Doctoral Commencement Speaker. Rubenstein was appointed Assistant Professor of Religion at Wesleyan University in 2006, Associate Professor in 2011, and Professor in 2014. She won the Wesleyan Binswanger Prize for Excellence in Teaching in 2017.

Research 
Rubenstein's research uncovers the mythological and theological legacies of contemporary philosophy and science. While her early work investigated the disavowal of wonder in phenomenology and deconstruction, her more recent writing has moved into the metaphysical underpinnings of cosmology, astronomy and space travel, general relativity and quantum mechanics, and non-linear biology and ecology. One voice in these fields has called her “perhaps our most intrepid and brilliant contemporary philosopher of religion".

Publications 
 Astrotopia: The Dangerous Religion of the Corporate Space Race (Chicago: University of Chicago Press, 2022).
 Image: Three Inquiries in Technology and Imagination, with Thomas A. Carlson and Mark C. Taylor (Chicago: University of Chicago Press, 2021).
 Pantheologies: Gods, Worlds, Monsters (New York: Columbia University Press, 2018 [cloth], 2021 [paper]).
 Entangled Worlds: Science, Religion, and New Materialisms, co-edited with Catherine Keller (New York: Fordham University Press, 2017).
 Worlds without End: The Many Lives of the Multiverse (New York: Columbia University Press, 2014 [cloth], 2015 [paper]).
 Polydox Reflections, co-edited with Kathryn Tanner (London: Wiley-Blackwell, 2014).
 Strange Wonder: The Closure of Metaphysics and the Opening of Awe (New York: Columbia University Press, 2009 [cloth], 2011 [paper]).
Rubenstein has also published numerous articles, chapters, and interviews.

Personal life 
Rubenstein has a wife, two children, and a wide extended family of relatives and friends. She lives in Middletown, Connecticut.

References

External links 
 
 Publications
 Twitter

Living people
1977 births
American philosophers
Williams College alumni
Alumni of the University of Cambridge
Columbia University alumni
Wesleyan University faculty
Members of the Jesus Seminar